Tippe Emmott, (born October 24, 1990) is an American beauty pageant titleholder from Springfield, Missouri who was named Miss Missouri 2012.

Biography
Emmott won the title of Miss Missouri on June 9, 2012, when she received her crown from outgoing titleholder Sydney Friar. Emmott's platform is 'POINTE' - “Building self-confidence to achieve success” and she said she hoped to encourage children build self-confidence and to set goals for themselves during her year as Miss Missouri. Her competition talent was ballet en pointe.

Emmott is a 2009 graduate of Glendale High School and is a junior at Drury University, majoring in communications with a minor in Public Relations.

References

External links

 
 

Miss America 2013 delegates
1990 births
Living people
People from Springfield, Missouri
Drury University alumni
American beauty pageant winners